Airenjaa is the first "Best Of" album by , released on 27 January 2010. 15 songs were from past releases with 2 new songs added. The lyrics of the new song,, was penned by Nonaka herself.
One of the new songs, was selected as 2010 January's ending theme for "", a weekly 30-minute anime song and artist-related program that has monthly changing opening and ending themes and is broadcast by TV Tokyo.
As part of the efforts in promoting this album, Nonaka appeared as the pickup artist for the third time in Anison Plus (broadcast on 25 January 2010 27:15, i.e. 26 January 2010 3.15am). The theme of Airenjā is about five rangers led by the green ranger (renjā) protecting love (ai), thus rangers of love.

Track listing

LOVE@MESSENGER

espresso

CACAO85

VOICE

New song for this album

New song for this album

DVD (PV CLIPS) (Initial Limited Edition Only)

LOVE@MESSENGER

Sweet Sunny Day

References

External links
 Official Discography of Ai Nonaka

2010 greatest hits albums
Ai Nonaka albums